The East Dorset by-election was a Parliamentary by-election held on 16 March 1904. The constituency returned one Member of Parliament (MP) to the House of Commons of the United Kingdom, elected by the first past the post voting system.

Vacancy
Hon. Humphrey Sturt had been Conservative MP for the seat of East Dorset since the 1891 By-Election. His succession to the peerage as Baron Alington came on 17 February 1904.

Electoral history
The seat had been Conservative since they gained it in 1886. They held the seat at the last election:

Candidates
The local Conservative Association selected 47-year-old Charles Van Raalte as their candidate to defend the seat. He was Mayor of Poole in 1903. Van Raalte was of Dutch descent and lived locally on Brownsea Island.

The local Liberal Association selected 29-year-old Hon. Charles Lyell as their candidate to gain the seat. Lyell was commissioned as a lieutenant in the Forfar and Kincardine Artillery Militia in 1900.

Campaign
Polling Day was fixed for 16 March 1904, 27 days after the previous MP went to the Lords.

Result
The Liberals gained the seat from the Conservatives:

Aftermath
At the following General Election the result was:

References

1904 in England
1904 elections in the United Kingdom
By-elections to the Parliament of the United Kingdom in Dorset constituencies
20th century in Dorset